Tina Peters may refer to:

Tina Peters (politician), Mesa County Clerk and Recorder, 2022 candidate in Republican primary for Colorado Secretary of State
Tina Peters (field hockey) (born 1968) Olympian